New Fork can refer to either:

New Fork River, a tributary of the Green River in Wyoming
New Fork, Wyoming, a ghost town